Hassar is a genus of thorny catfishes native to South America.

Species 
There are currently five recognized species in this genus:
 Hassar affinis (Steindachner, 1881)
 Hassar gabiru Birindelli, Fayal & Wosiacki, 2011
 Hassar orestis (Steindachner, 1875)
 Hassar shewellkeimi Sabaj Pérez & Birindelli, 2013
 Hassar wilderi Kindle, 1895

Description
Like other doradids, Hassar species have a row of scutes on each side of their body, though they are more subdued. Hassar species grow to approximately 15.7–25.0 centimetres (6.2–9.8 in) SL.

In the aquarium
Hassar species are very rarely imported for the aquarium hobby, and the most commonly imported species is H. orestis. Care of this species is not straightforward; they are hard to acclimate if not in good condition at the point of sale. They are always wild caught. However, once settled in they are easier to care for. These fish should be provided with dense vegetation to feel comfortable. They are not aggressive, though smaller fish are very shy in the presence of larger fish.

References

Doradidae
Fish of South America
Fish of the Amazon basin
Catfish genera
Taxa named by Carl H. Eigenmann
Taxa named by Rosa Smith Eigenmann
Freshwater fish genera